Marc G. Serré  (born January 28, 1967) is a Canadian Liberal politician, who was elected to represent the riding of Nickel Belt in the House of Commons of Canada in the 2015 federal election. He is the son of Gaetan Serré, who represented Nickel Belt from 1968 to 1972 under the government of Pierre Trudeau, and the nephew of another former Liberal Member of Parliament Benoît Serré.

Prior to his election to the House of Commons, Serré was manager of business services for EastLink's operations in Ontario, and served on the municipal council of West Nipissing and the Conseil scolaire de district catholique du Nouvel-Ontario. He was a candidate for mayor of Greater Sudbury in the 2010 municipal election, but withdrew his candidacy in advance of election day.

In the House of Commons he has served as Parliamentary Secretary. He was also the co-chair of the Indigenous Caucus with MP Robert-Falcon Ouellette. He was part of the largest Indigenous caucus in Canadian history elected in 2015.

Offices and Roles as a Parliamentarian 
 Parliamentary Secretary to the Minister of Official Languages
 Former Parliamentary Secretary to the Minister of Natural Resources
 Former Parliamentary Secretary to the Minister of Rural Economic Development

Electoral record

References

External links

Living people
Liberal Party of Canada MPs
Members of the House of Commons of Canada from Ontario
Politicians from Greater Sudbury
Franco-Ontarian people
Year of birth uncertain
Ontario municipal councillors
Ontario school board trustees
1967 births
21st-century Canadian politicians
People from West Nipissing